Bloodlined Calligraphy is an American Christian metal band, and they primarily play metalcore. They come from Ypsilanti, Michigan. The band started making music in 1999. Their membership was Matt Carter, Ally French, Ryan Hampton, and Eric Cargile. The band released, Say Hi to the Bad Guy, an album, with Selah Records, in 2002. The group became part of Strike First Records, where they released, The Beginning of the End, an extended play, in 2004. They signed to Facedown Records, where they released, They Want You Silent, another studio album, in 2004. Their subsequent studio album, Ypsilanti, was released by Facedown Records, in 2006. The band played their last show on April 19, 2014. The band reunited in 2017 for Facedown Fest 2017.

Background
Bloodlined Calligraphy is a Christian metal band from Ypsilanti, Michigan. The band's members were vocalist and drummer, Matt Carter, vocalist and pianist, Ally French, guitarist and vocalist, Ryan Hampton, and bassist, Eric Cargile. Cargile died in 2010.

Music history
The band commenced as a musical entity in 2002, with their first release, Say Hi to the Bad Guy, an album that was released by Selah Records, in 2002. They released, an extended play, The Beginning of the End, with Strike First Records in 2004. The group signed to Facedown Records, where they released, a studio album, They Want You Silent, on April 26, 2005. Their subsequent studio album, Ypsilanti, was released on September 19, 2006 by Facedown Records.

Members
Current
Ally French - vocals, piano (2003–2006, 2014-present)  
Ryan Hampton - guitars, backing vocals (1999–2014, 2017–present), drums (2007)
Shawn Williams - guitars (2004-present) 
Matt "Birdman" Fleming - vocals (1999–2003), bass (2012–2014, 2017–present)
Josh Badura - drums (2008–present)

Former members;
Eric Cargile - bass, guitars (1999–2010, his death) 
Joshua Colvin - guitars (1999–2002)
Jason "Jay" Bowden - guitars (2002–2004)
Robbie Coran - drums (2006–2007)
Ellen Hoffman - vocals (2006–2007) 
Chris Norman - drums (2007–2008)
Matt Carter - drums, backing vocals (1999–2006, 2012–2014)
Nina Cislaghi - vocals (2008-2014)

Discography
Studio albums
 They Want You Silent (April 26, 2005, Facedown)
 Ypsilanti (September 19, 2006, Facedown)

Independent albums
 Say Hi to the Bad Guy (2002, Selah)

EPs
 The Beginning of the End (2004, Strike First)

References

External links
 Cross Rhythms artist profile
 AllMusic profile

Musical groups from Michigan
2002 establishments in Michigan
Musical groups established in 2002
2006 disestablishments in Michigan
Musical groups disestablished in 2006
Facedown Records artists
Strike First Records artists
Metalcore musical groups from Michigan